Novopsocus magnus is a species of Pseudocaeciliidae that lives on the island of New Guinea. Males of this species were first thought by Thornton (1984) to be males of N. stenopterus, but Cuénoud (2008) showed that it is indeed a separate species by identifying real males of N. stenopterus and actual females of N. magnus.
It is the largest species of the genus, and its males have peculiar antennae, with a first flagellar segment strongly broadened and flattened.

References

 Thornton, I. W. B. 1984. An unusual psocopteran from new Guinea and its relationships within the Philotarsidae. International journal of entomology. 26: 378-385.
 Cuénoud, P. 2008. A revision of the New Guinean genus Novopsocus Thornton (Psocoptera, Pseudocaeciliidae) with the description of two new species. Revue Suisse de Zoologie. 115 : 331-340

Pseudocaeciliidae
Insects of New Guinea
Insects described in 2008